Kim Hyun-Jung or Kim Hyeon-Jung or Kim Hyeon-jeong is a transliteration of one Korean name. It may refer to:

 Kim Hyun-jung (singer) (born 1976)
 Big Mama King (born 1973), Korean jazz singer
 Kim Hyeon-jung (figure skater) (born 1992)
  (born 1979), South Korean painter and actress

See also
 Kim Hyun-joong, South Korean singer
 Kim Hyung-jun, South Korean singer